Michael McGill (born 12 July 1945) is a South African cricketer. He played in seven first-class matches for Border from 1975/76 to 1979/80.

See also
 List of Border representative cricketers

References

External links
 

1945 births
Living people
South African cricketers
Border cricketers